Walter Bennett may refer to:

 Walter Bennett (footballer, born 1874) (1874–1908), English international footballer (Sheffield United)
 Walter Bennett (footballer, born 1918) (1918–2009), English footballer (Barnsley, Doncaster Rovers)
 Walter Bennett (footballer, born 1997), Aruban footballer
 Walter Bennett (rugby union) (1906–1979), Australian rugby union player
 Walter Bennett (politician) (1864–1934), Australian politician